This is a list of the bird species recorded in the Cook Islands. The avifauna of the Cook Islands include a total of 88 species, of which 7 are endemic and 3 have been introduced by humans.

This list's taxonomic treatment (designation and sequence of orders, families and species) and nomenclature (common and scientific names) follow the conventions of The Clements Checklist of Birds of the World, 2022 edition. The family accounts at the beginning of each heading reflect this taxonomy, as do the species counts found in each family account. Introduced and accidental species are included in the total counts for the Cook Islands.

The following tags have been used to highlight several categories. Not all species fall into one of these categories. Those that do not are commonly occurring native species.

(A) Accidental - a species that rarely or accidentally occurs in the Cook Islands
(E) Endemic - a species endemic to the Cook Islands
(Ex) Extinct - a species extinct to the Cook Islands
(I) Introduced - a species introduced to the Cook Islands as a consequence, direct or indirect, of human actions

Ducks, geese, and waterfowl
Order: AnseriformesFamily: Anatidae

Anatidae includes the ducks and most duck-like waterfowl, such as geese and swans. These birds are adapted to an aquatic existence with webbed feet, flattened bills, and feathers that are excellent at shedding water due to an oily coating.

Pacific black duck, Anas superciliosa
Eastern spot-billed duck, Anas zonorhyncha
Mallard, Anas platyrhynchos (A)
Northern pintail, Anas acuta (A)
Aitutaki whistling duck, Dendrocygna sp. (Ex)

Pheasants, grouse, and allies 
Order: GalliformesFamily: Phasianidae

The Phasianidae are a family of terrestrial birds which consists of quails, partridges, snowcocks, francolins, spurfowls, tragopans, monals, pheasants, peafowls, grouse, ptarmigan, and jungle fowls. In general, they are plump (although they vary in size) and have broad, relatively short wings.

Red junglefowl, Gallus gallus (I)

Pigeons and doves
Order: ColumbiformesFamily: Columbidae

Pigeons and doves are stout-bodied birds with short necks and short slender bills with a fleshy cere.

Rock pigeon, Columba livia
Cook Islands fruit-dove, Ptilinopus rarotongensis (E)
Pacific imperial-pigeon, Ducula pacifica
Great ground dove, Pampusana nui (Ex)
Ducula cf. galeata (Ex)

Cuckoos
Order: CuculiformesFamily: Cuculidae

The family Cuculidae includes cuckoos, roadrunners and anis. These birds are of variable size with slender bodies, long tails and strong legs. The Old World cuckoos are brood parasites.

Long-tailed koel, Urodynamis taitensis

Swifts
Order: CaprimulgiformesFamily: Apodidae

Swifts are small birds which spend the majority of their lives flying. These birds have very short legs and never settle voluntarily on the ground, perching instead only on vertical surfaces. Many swifts have long swept-back wings which resemble a crescent or boomerang.

Atiu swiftlet, Aerodramus sawtelli (E)
Mangaia swiftlet, Aerodramus manuoi (Ex)

Rails, gallinules, and coots
Order: GruiformesFamily: Rallidae

Rallidae is a large family of small to medium-sized birds which includes the rails, crakes, coots and gallinules. Typically they inhabit dense vegetation in damp environments near lakes, swamps or rivers. In general they are shy and secretive birds, making them difficult to observe. Most species have strong legs and long toes which are well adapted to soft uneven surfaces. They tend to have short, rounded wings and to be weak fliers.

Mangaia rail, Gallirallus ripleyi (Ex)
Spotless crake, Zapornia tabuensis (A)
Mangaia crake, Porzana rua (Ex)

Plovers and lapwings
Order: CharadriiformesFamily: Charadriidae

The family Charadriidae includes the plovers, dotterels and lapwings. They are small to medium-sized birds with compact bodies, short, thick necks and long, usually pointed, wings. They are found in open country worldwide, mostly in habitats near water.

Black-bellied plover, Pluvialis squatarola
Pacific golden-plover, Pluvialis fulva
Masked lapwing, Vanellus miles (A)

Sandpipers and allies
Order: CharadriiformesFamily: Scolopacidae

Scolopacidae is a large diverse family of small to medium-sized shorebirds including the sandpipers, curlews, godwits, shanks, tattlers, woodcocks, snipes, dowitchers and phalaropes. The majority of these species eat small invertebrates picked out of the mud or soil. Variation in length of legs and bills enables multiple species to feed in the same habitat, particularly on the coast, without direct competition for food.

Bristle-thighed curlew, Numenius tahitiensis
Whimbrel, Numenius phaeopus (A)
Bar-tailed godwit, Limosa lapponica (A)
Ruddy turnstone, Arenaria interpres
Sanderling, Calidris alba
Pectoral sandpiper, Calidris melanotos (A)
Common sandpiper, Actitis hypoleucos (A)
Spotted sandpiper, Actitis macularius (A)
Gray-tailed tattler, Tringa brevipes
Wandering tattler, Tringa incana
Mangaia sandpiper, Prosobonia sp. (Ex)

Skuas and jaegers
Order: CharadriiformesFamily: Stercorariidae

The family Stercorariidae are, in general, medium to large birds, typically with grey or brown plumage, often with white markings on the wings. They nest on the ground in temperate and arctic regions and are long-distance migrants.

Parasitic jaeger, Stercorarius parasiticus (A)

Gulls, terns, and skimmers
Order: CharadriiformesFamily: Laridae

Laridae is a family of medium to large seabirds, the gulls, terns, and skimmers. Gulls are typically grey or white, often with black markings on the head or wings. They have stout, longish bills and webbed feet. Terns are a group of generally medium to large seabirds typically with grey or white plumage, often with black markings on the head. Most terns hunt fish by diving but some pick insects off the surface of fresh water. Terns are generally long-lived birds, with several species known to live in excess of 30 years.

Laughing gull, Leucophaeus atricilla (A)
Brown noddy, Anous stolidus
Black noddy, Anous minutus (A)
Gray noddy, Anous albivitta
Blue-gray noddy, Anous ceruleus
White tern, Gygis alba
Sooty tern, Onychoprion fuscatus
Gray-backed tern, Onychoprion lunatus
Black-naped tern, Sterna sumatrana
Common tern, Sterna hirundo
Great crested tern, Thalasseus bergii (A)

Tropicbirds
Order: PhaethontiformesFamily: Phaethontidae

Tropicbirds are slender white birds of tropical oceans, with exceptionally long central tail feathers. Their heads and long wings have black markings. 

White-tailed tropicbird, Phaethon lepturus
Red-tailed tropicbird, Phaethon rubricauda

Albatrosses
Order: ProcellariiformesFamily: Diomedeidae

The albatrosses are among the largest of flying birds, and the great albatrosses from the genus Diomedea have the largest wingspans of any extant birds.

Black-browed albatross, Thalassarche melanophris (A)
Royal albatross, Diomedea epomophora
Wandering albatross, Diomedea exulans (A)

Southern storm-petrels
Order: ProcellariiformesFamily: Oceanitidae

The southern storm-petrels are relatives of the petrels and are the smallest seabirds. They feed on planktonic crustaceans and small fish picked from the surface, typically while hovering. The flight is fluttering and sometimes bat-like.

Wilson's storm-petrel, Oceanites oceanicus (A)
White-faced storm-petrel, Pelagodroma marina (A)
White-bellied storm-petrel, Fregetta grallaria
Polynesian storm-petrel, Nesofregetta fuliginosa

Northern storm-petrels
Order: ProcellariiformesFamily: Hydrobatidae

Though the members of this family are similar in many respects to the southern storm-petrels, including their general appearance and habits, there are enough genetic differences to warrant their placement in a separate family.

Leach's storm-petrel, Hydrobates leucorhous (A)

Shearwaters and petrels
Order: ProcellariiformesFamily: Procellariidae

The procellariids are the main group of medium-sized "true petrels", characterised by united nostrils with medium septum and a long outer functional primary.

Southern giant-petrel, Macronectes giganteus (A)
Northern giant-petrel, Macronectes halli (A)
Cape petrel, Daption capense
Kermadec petrel, Pterodroma neglecta (A)
Herald petrel, Pterodroma heraldica
Murphy's petrel, Pterodroma ultima
Mottled petrel, Pterodroma inexpectata
White-necked petrel, Pterodroma cervicalis (A)
Black-winged petrel, Pterodroma nigripennis
Cook's petrel, Pterodroma cookii (A)
Gould's petrel, Pterodroma leucoptera
Collared petrel, Pterodroma brevipes
Phoenix petrel, Pterodroma alba (A)
Bulwer's petrel, Bulweria bulwerii 
Tahiti petrel, Pseudobulweria rostrata
Wedge-tailed shearwater, Ardenna pacifica (A)
Buller's shearwater, Ardenna bulleri
Sooty shearwater, Ardenna griseus
Short-tailed shearwater, Ardenna tenuirostris
Christmas shearwater, Puffinus nativitatis
Tropical shearwater, Puffinus bailloni

Frigatebirds
Order: SuliformesFamily: Fregatidae

Frigatebirds are large seabirds usually found over tropical oceans. They are large, black and white or completely black, with long wings and deeply forked tails. The males have coloured inflatable throat pouches. They do not swim or walk and cannot take off from a flat surface. Having the largest wingspan-to-body-weight ratio of any bird, they are essentially aerial, able to stay aloft for more than a week.

Lesser frigatebird, Fregata ariel
Great frigatebird, Fregata minor

Boobies and gannets
Order: SuliformesFamily: Sulidae

The sulids comprise the gannets and boobies. Both groups are medium to large coastal seabirds that plunge-dive for fish.

Masked booby, Sula dactylatra
Brown booby, Sula leucogaster
Red-footed booby, Sula sula

Herons, egrets, and bitterns
Order: PelecaniformesFamily: Ardeidae

The family Ardeidae contains the bitterns, herons, and egrets. Herons and egrets are medium to large wading birds with long necks and legs. Bitterns tend to be shorter necked and more wary. Members of Ardeidae fly with their necks retracted, unlike other long-necked birds such as storks, ibises and spoonbills.

Pacific reef-heron, Egretta sacra
Striated heron, Butorides striata (A)

Hawks, eagles, and kites
Order: AccipitriformesFamily: Accipitridae

Accipitridae is a family of birds of prey, which includes hawks, eagles, kites, harriers and Old World vultures. These birds have powerful hooked beaks for tearing flesh from their prey, strong legs, powerful talons and keen eyesight.

Eastern marsh-harrier, Circus spilonotus (A)

Kingfishers
Order: CoraciiformesFamily: Alcedinidae

Kingfishers are medium-sized birds with large heads, long pointed bills, short legs and stubby tails.

Mewing kingfisher, Todirhamphus ruficollaris (E)
Chattering kingfisher, Todirhamphus tuta

Old World parrots
Order: PsittaciformesFamily: Psittaculidae

Characteristic features of parrots include a strong curved bill, an upright stance, strong legs, and clawed zygodactyl feet. Many parrots are vividly coloured, and some are multi-coloured. Old World parrots are found from Africa east across south and southeast Asia and Oceania to Australia and New Zealand.

Kuhl's lorikeet, Vini kuhlii (I)
Blue lorikeet, Vini peruviana

Monarch flycatchers
Order: PasseriformesFamily: Monarchidae

The monarch flycatchers are small to medium-sized insectivorous passerines which hunt by flycatching.

Rarotonga monarch, Pomarea dimidiata (E)

Reed warblers and allies
Order: PasseriformesFamily: Acrocephalidae

The members of this family are usually rather large for "warblers". Most are rather plain olivaceous brown above with much yellow to beige below. They are usually found in open woodland, reedbeds, or tall grass. The family occurs mostly in southern to western Eurasia and surroundings, but it also ranges far into the Pacific, with some species in Africa.

 Cook Islands reed warbler, Acrocephalus kerearako (E)

Starlings
Order: PasseriformesFamily: Sturnidae

Starlings are small to medium-sized passerine birds. Their flight is strong and direct and they are very gregarious. Their preferred habitat is fairly open country. They eat insects and fruit. Plumage is typically dark with a metallic sheen.

Rarotonga starling, Aplonis cinerascens (E)
Mysterious/Mauke starling, Aplonis mavornata (Ex)
Common myna, Acridotheres tristis (I)
Jungle myna, Acridotheres fuscus (A)

Waxbills and allies
Order: PasseriformesFamily: Estrildidae

The estrildid finches are small passerine birds of the Old World tropics and Australasia. They are gregarious and often colonial seed eaters with short thick but pointed bills. They are all similar in structure and habits, but have wide variation in plumage colours and patterns.

Chestnut-breasted munia, Lonchura castaneothorax

See also
List of birds
Lists of birds by region

References

Cook Islands
'
birds